The Marfell Lakes (1 and 2) are reservoirs in Boulder County near Lafayette-Louisville in the U.S. state of Colorado.

References

Reservoirs in Colorado
Bodies of water of Boulder County, Colorado